Sheldon Kinser (December 9, 1942 – August 1, 1988), was an American race car driver. 

Kinser, a Bloomington, Indiana native, died of cancer. He was a three-time USAC Sprint Car Series Champion (1977, 1981, 1982).  He also drove in the USAC and CART Championship Car series.  He competed during the 1975-1981 seasons, with 38 combined career starts, including the Indianapolis 500 each year except 1980, when he failed to qualify.  He had 11 top-10 finishes, with a best of third at Texas World Speedway in 1979.

Sheldon was the second cousin, 1x removed of Steve Kinser, the 20-time World of Outlaws sprint-car champion, and second cousin, 2x removed of Mark Kinser.

Award
 He was inducted into the National Sprint Car Hall of Fame in 1992.

Indianapolis 500 results

References

External links 
 

1944 births
1988 deaths
Indianapolis 500 drivers
National Sprint Car Hall of Fame inductees
Sportspeople from Bloomington, Indiana
Racing drivers from Indiana
Burials in Indiana
World of Outlaws drivers
USAC Silver Crown Series drivers